Be as You Are (Songs from an Old Blue Chair) is the ninth studio album by American country music singer Kenny Chesney, released on January 25, 2005. The album debuted at number one album on the US Billboard 200 chart.

The album's opening track was originally recorded by Chesney on his When the Sun Goes Down album. This album was intended by Chesney to be a side project, and it produced no singles, although "Guitars and Tiki Bars" reached number 53 on the Hot Country Songs charts based on unsolicited airplay.

Track listing

Personnel
As listed in liner notes

 Wyatt Beard – background vocals
 David Briggs – piano, keyboards, B3 organ
 Mat Britain – steel drums
 Pat Buchanan – electric guitar, harmonica
 Buddy Cannon – background vocals
 Murray Cannon – background vocals
 Kenny Chesney – acoustic guitar, lead vocals
 J. T. Corenflos – electric guitar, gut string guitar, nylon string guitar
 Chad Cromwell – drums
 Eric Darken – percussion
 Robert Greenidge – steel drums
 Tim Hensley – background vocals
 Steve Herman – trumpet
 John Hobbs – piano, keyboards, B3 organ
 Jim Hoke – tenor saxophone, penny whistle
 Jim Horn – tenor saxophone
 John Jorgenson – electric guitar
 Paul Leim – drums, percussion, shaker
 B. James Lowry – acoustic guitar, electric guitar, nylon string guitar, steel guitar
 Randy McCormick – piano, keyboards, B3 organ, wurlitzer electric piano
 Liana Manis – background vocals
 Larry Paxton – bass guitar, fretless bass, background vocals
 Tom Roady – percussion, tambourine
 Amy Joe Stelzer – intro to "Key Lime Pie"
 Mark Tamburino – intro to "Key Lime Pie"
 Quentin Ware Jr. – trumpet
 Tommy White – Dobro
 John Willis – acoustic guitar, electric guitar, gut string guitar, nylon string guitar

Charts

Weekly charts

Year-end charts

Certifications

References

External links
 

2005 albums
Albums produced by Buddy Cannon
BNA Records albums
Kenny Chesney albums